Grupo Saker-Ti was a Guatemalan group of writers formed in 1947. The name derives from the Cakchiquel language word for "dawn." Because they were left-wing ideologues who supported the democratically elected presidents of Guatemala Juan José Arévalo and Jacobo Arbenz Guzmán, a December 1952 United States Central Intelligence Agency report stated that "one of the oldest and most consistently prominent of the (Communist) front groups is Grupo Saker-Ti, an organization formed by militant young intellectuals associated with the leftist-nationalist Revolution of 1944."

The movement disbanded and many of its members fled Guatemala following the 1954 Operation PBSuccess that overthrew the government.

Grupo Saker-Ti members included:
 Julio Fausto Aguilera (b. 1929), poet
 Huberto Alvarado (1927-1974), poet, politician
 Melvin René Barahona (1931-1965), poet
 Adalberto de León Soto (1919-1957), sculptor
 Abelardo Rodas Barrios (1930-1988), poet
 Carlos Navarrete (b. 1931), writer, anthropologist
 Raúl Leiva (1916-1975), poet
 Werner Ovalle López (1928-1970), poet
 Oscar Arturo Palencia (1932-1981), writer
 Roberto Paz y Paz (1927-2004), journalist 
 Rafael Sosa (b. 1928), poet
 Olga Martínez Torres, (b. 1927), poet
 José María López Valdizón (1929-1975), writer
 Orlando Vitola (1922-1952), writer
 Enrique Palmer (b. 1934), writer and poet.
 * Jorge Sarmientos (b.1931-2012) Musician

References
Guatemalan Literature Webpage
 Government of Guatemala, Ministry of Culture and Sports
 Foreign Relations of the United States, 1952–1954 Retrospective Volume, Guatemala, Document 33
 U.S. Department of State, Central Intelligence Agency report

Artist groups and collectives
Guatemalan culture